Blair Thoreson is a former American politician. He served as a North Dakota Republican Party member of the North Dakota House of Representatives, representing the 44th Legislative District in Fargo, N.D. from 1999 to 2016.

Biography

Early life and education
Blair Thoreson was born on May 6, 1964 in Fargo, North Dakota. He received a bachelor's degree in Communications from the North Dakota State University and a master's degree in Management from the University of Mary.

Career
Thoreson spent fourteen years employed in the telecommunications sector. He owns Three Lyons Pub in West Fargo, ND.

From 1999 to 2016 he served as a Republican state representative for North Dakota, representing the 44th Legislative District in Fargo  He served as chairman of the House Appropriations - Government Operations committee. Additionally, he served on the Administrative Rules, Budget Section, and Information Technology committees.

Thoreson is employed in government relations and regulatory affairs with Primacy Strategy Group, based in St. Paul, MN with offices in Bismarck, ND and Washington, DC.

Personal life
He is married to Jennifer Thoreson, and they have two children. They reside in Fargo, where they attend the First Lutheran Church.

References

https://www.threelyonspub.com

Republican Party members of the North Dakota House of Representatives
1964 births
Living people
Politicians from Fargo, North Dakota
North Dakota State University alumni
University of Mary alumni
21st-century American politicians